General Cumming may refer to:

Alfred Cumming (general) (1829–1910), Confederate States Army brigadier general
Andrew Cumming (fl. 1960s–2000s), British Army major general
Hanway Robert Cumming (1867–1921), British Army brigadier general
Henry John Cumming (1771–1856), British Army general
Samuel C. Cumming (1895–1983), U.S. Marine Corps major general

See also
Emerson LeRoy Cummings (1902–1986), U.S. Army lieutenant general
James Turner Cummins (1843–1912), British Indian Army major general